José Alexis Armenteros Suárez (born December 13, 1992) is a Cuban judoka. He competed at the 2016 Summer Olympics in the men's 100 kg event, in which he was eliminated in the third round by Ramadan Darwish.

References

External links
 
 

1992 births
Living people
Cuban male judoka
Olympic judoka of Cuba
Judoka at the 2016 Summer Olympics
Pan American Games medalists in judo
Pan American Games bronze medalists for Cuba
Judoka at the 2015 Pan American Games
Medalists at the 2015 Pan American Games
20th-century Cuban people
21st-century Cuban people